Atlantilux rubra is a species of sea snail, a marine gastropod mollusk, in the family Costellariidae, the ribbed miters.

Distribution
This marine species occurs off New Caledonia.

References

 Hervier, J., 1897. Description d'espèces nouvelles de mollusques, provenant de l'archipel de la Nouvelle-Calédonie. Journal de Conchyliologie 45: 47-69
 Hervier, J., 1898 Diagnoses d'espèces nouvelles de Triforis, provenant de l'archipel de la Nouvelle-Calédonie (suite) Journal de Conchyliologie, 45"1897 249-266
 Fischer-Piette, E., 1950. Liste des types décrits dans le Journal de Conchyliologie et conservés dans la collection de ce journal (avec planches)(suite). Journal de Conchyliologie 90: 149-180
 Cernohorsky, W.O., 1981. Revision of J. Hervier's type-specimens of Mitracea (Mollusca, Gastropoda) from the Loyalty Islands. Bulletin du Muséum national d'Histoire naturelle 3(1): 93-1109, sér. 4° série, part. Section A

External links
 Broderip W.J. (1836 ("1835) ). Characters of new genera and species of the Mollusca and Conchifera, collected by Mr. Cuming [Shells of the genus Mitra, Lam., and one species of Conoelix, Swains., forming part of the collection of Mr. Cuming. Proceedings of the Zoological Society of London. 3: 192-198.]
 Fedosov A.E., Puillandre N., Herrmann M., Dgebuadze P. & Bouchet P. (2017). Phylogeny, systematics, and evolution of the family Costellariidae (Gastropoda: Neogastropoda). Zoological Journal of the Linnean Society. 179(3): 541-626

Costellariidae
Gastropods described in 1836